David Rosello Rodríguez (born June 26, 1950) is a former Major League Baseball player.

See also
 List of Major League Baseball players from Puerto Rico

External links

1950 births
Living people
Charleston Charlies players
Chicago Cubs players
Cleveland Indians players
Major League Baseball players from Puerto Rico
Major League Baseball second basemen
Major League Baseball shortstops
Major League Baseball third basemen
People from Mayagüez, Puerto Rico
Portland Beavers players
Quincy Cubs players
San Antonio Missions players
Wichita Aeros players